Macyville is a ghost town in Cloud County, Kansas, United States.

History
The Macyville post office, originally called Ten Mile, was established in 1871. It was discontinued in 1905.

Macyville was named for its first postmaster, George W. Macy.

References

Further reading

External links
 Cloud County maps: Current, Historic, KDOT

Unincorporated communities in Cloud County, Kansas
Unincorporated communities in Kansas